Shuakhevi is a small town in Georgia's Autonomous Republic of Adjara, 67 km east to the regional capital Batumi. Situated on the right bank of the Adjaristsqali River, it is an administrative center of Shuakhevi District, which comprises the town itself and 67 adjoining mountainous villages. The area of the district is 588 km2; population – 15,044 (2014).

There is a plant to build Shuakhevi hydro power plant, a run-of-the-river plant with installed capacity of 185 MW with expected electricity output of 452 GWh. It is expected to be commissioned in 2016.

Near the town are the ruins of a medieval fortress.

See also 
 Adjara
 Subdivisions of Georgia

References

External links
 Map of Ajaria

Cities and towns in Adjara
Batum Oblast